Spathidexia dunningii is a species of bristle fly in the family Tachinidae.

Distribution
Canada, United States, Costa Rica, Jamaica.

References

Dexiinae
Diptera of North America
Taxa named by Daniel William Coquillett
Insects described in 1895